Tamás Sárközi("Veso") (born 2 April 1994) is a Hungarian football player who currently plays for Salgótarján.

Club statistics

Updated to games played as of 4 May 2014.

References
Profile at MLSZ 

1994 births
Living people
People from Salgótarján
Hungarian footballers
Association football forwards
Mezőkövesdi SE footballers
Nemzeti Bajnokság I players
Sportspeople from Nógrád County